"Infinity", also known as "Infinity (1990's... Time for the Guru)", is the debut single by British acid house musician Guru Josh. It was originally released in December 1989 as the lead single from his debut album of the same name. The song was re-released in 2008 in a remixed version called "Infinity 2008".

1989 release
The song was first released in 1989 from the album of the same name. It achieved success in many European countries, such as Spain, Germany, UK and Austria in 1989 and 1990, peaking at number five on the UK Singles Chart in March 1990, and has been featured on numerous dance compilations from 1990 to the present day.

Track listings
 7" single
 "Infinity" (1990s... Time for the Guru)
 "Infinity" (Spacey saxophone mix)
 12" maxi
 "Infinity" (1990s... Time for the Guru 12" mix) — 7:25
 "Infinity" (Spacey saxophone mix) — 4:03
 "Infinity" (1990s... Time for the Guru 7" mix) — 4:00

Charts

Weekly charts

Year-end charts

Certifications

DJ Taucher version 

DJ Taucher released a heavier techno version of the song in 1995. This version is not to be found on any of his studio albums, but is included on the compilation albums Dance Now! 10 and Maxi Dance Sensation 18.

Track listings
 CD maxi
 "Infinity (Phase I)" — 4:18
 "Infinity (Phase II)" — 7:35
 "Infinity (Phase III)" — 5:30
 "Mental Thing (Phase IV)" — 6:34

Chart positions

Infinity 2008

In 2007, the 'Guru Josh Project' was formed, and included Guru Josh, Snakebyte and the man that inspired the project, Darren Bailie. The 'Guru Josh Project's' adaptation of Infinity became another hit in 2008 and 2009 as a remixed version by DJ Klaas, under the title "Infinity 2008". The release enjoyed much success, reaching number one in France, Belgium, Denmark, Poland, Hungary and on the Eurochart Hot 100, and reached number two on the German dance chart. It peaked at number three on the UK Singles Chart. The remix was written by Paul Walden and produced by Klaas Gerling and Jerome Isma-Ae. It was published by EMI Music.

In April 2009, the track was picked up by Ultra Music in the United States and debuted on the Billboard Hot Dance Airplay chart, where it reached the number one spot, dethroning Lady Gaga's Poker Face, in May 2009.

In France, the song was included on the double compilation NRJ Music Awards 2009. The video features German playmate Janina Wissler (Playboy's Girl of September 2005) and Josh.

In Germany, the song was released under the Kontor Records.

Track listings
 CD single
 "Infinity 2008" (Klaas vocal edit) — 3:12
 "Infinity 2008" (Klaas remix) — 6:29
 "Infinity 2008" (Jerome Isma-ae remix) — 7:33

 CD maxi
 "Infinity 2008" (Klaas remix) — 6:29
 "Infinity 2008" (Jerome Isma-ae remix) — 7:30
 "Infinity 2008" (Steen Thottrup Chill mix) — 6:02
 "Infinity 2008" (Klaas vocal edit) — 3:12

 12" maxi
 "Infinity 2008" (Klaas remix) — 6:29
 "Infinity 2008" (Jerôme Isma-ae remix) — 7:31

 CD maxi — Remixes
 "Infinity 2008" (Klaas vocal edit) — 3:12
 "Infinity 2008" (commercial radio edit) — 4:25
 "Infinity 2008" (Klaas vocal mix) — 4:54
 "Infinity 2008" (Klaas remix) — 6:29
 "Infinity 2008" (Jerôme Isma-ae remix) — 7:32
 "Infinity 2008" (Yvan and Dan Daniel remix) — 6:50
 "Infinity 2008" (Magic Mitch club mix) — 5:54
 "Infinity 2008" (Steen Thottrup Chill mix) — 6:00

Charts and sales

Weekly charts

Year-end charts

Certifications

Infinity 2012

The song was again remixed in 2012 by Swiss producers Antoine Konrad and Fabio Antoniali under the name "DJ Antoine vs. Mad Mark". It was released digitally in Austria, Germany, and Switzerland on 14 May 2012.

In June 2012, Unilever selected "Infinity 2012" as the soundtrack to the advertisement for the Magnum Infinity ice cream.

Track listing
CD single
"Infinity 2012" (DJ Antoine vs. Mad Mark Radio Edit) — 3:25
"Infinity 2012" (DJ Antoine vs. Mad Mark Remix) — 6:56

Digital download
"Infinity 2012" (DJ Antoine vs. Mad Mark Radio Edit) — 3:25
"Infinity 2012" (DJ Antoine vs. Mad Mark Remix) — 6:56
"Infinity 2012" (Robbie Rivera Juicy Remix) — 6:30
"Infinity 2012" (Loverush UK! Remix) — 6:48
"Infinity 2012" (PunX Soundcheck Dubstep Remix) — 5:42

Credits and personnel
Paul Walden — songwriter, composer, producer
Antoine Konrad — additional production 
Fabio Antoniali — additional production 
Hal Ritson — vocal production, saxophone production
Daniel Pearce — vocals
Ben Castle — saxophone

Credits adapted from "Infinity 2012" CD single liner notes.

Charts

Year-end charts

Certifications

References

External links
 Infinity2008.com

1989 songs
1989 debut singles
1990 singles
1995 singles
2008 singles
2009 singles
Deconstruction Records singles
European Hot 100 Singles number-one singles
Guru Josh songs
Ministry of Sound singles
Number-one singles in Denmark
Number-one singles in Israel
Number-one singles in Poland
SNEP Top Singles number-one singles
Ultra Music singles
Ultratop 50 Singles (Flanders) number-one singles